The freshwater-1 RNA motif is a conserved RNA structure that was discovered by bioinformatics.
Freshwater-1 motifs are found in metagenomic sequences isolated from bacteria in Freshwater and estuary environments.
Freshwater-1 RNAs likely function in trans as small RNAs.  Most freshwater-1 RNAs are located between tRNA genes, although no similarity between freshwater-1 RNAs and tRNAs has been observed, as of 2018.

References

Non-coding RNA